Xiphidium is a genus of herbs in the family Haemodoraceae first described as a genus in 1775. It is native to tropical regions of the Western Hemisphere.

 species

 Xiphidium caeruleum Aubl. - Mexico (Veracruz, Oaxaca, Chiapas, Tabasco, Puebla, Yucatán), Central America (all 7 countries), West Indies, South America (Colombia, Venezuela, Brazil (Acre, Amazonas, Roraima, Pará, Maranhão, Amapá), Guyana, Suriname, French Guiana, Ecuador, Peru, Bolivia)
 Xiphidium xanthorrhizon C.Wright ex Griseb. - western Cuba including Isla de la Juventud (formerly called Isle of Pines)

 formerly included
Xiphidium angustifolium - Schiekia orinocensis

Phylogeny 
Comparison of homologous DNA has increased the insight in the phylogenetic relationships between the genera in the Haemodoroideae subfamily. The following trees represent those insights.

References

External links
 

Haemodoraceae
Commelinales genera